Judbarra National Park, formerly Gregory National Park, is a national park in the Northern Territory of Australia, 359 km south of Darwin.

The park is the second largest national park in the Northern Territory, after Kakadu National Park, with an area of 13,000 km2 (1.3 million ha). 

The park was formerly known as Gregory National Park, but on 21 October 2011, it was announced that under a joint management plan with the traditional owners, the park would be dual-named "Judbarra" for a period of ten years. Beginning in 2021, its official name will be Judbarra National Park.

The park consists of two geographically disjoint sections. The larger section lies to the southwest of the smaller northeastern section.

Indigenous people and culture
The park includes traditional lands of several Indigenous Australian groups, including Ngarinyman, Karrangpurru, Malngin, Wardaman, Ngaliwurru, Nungali, Bilinara, Gurindji and Jaminjung, and spans the boundary between two major Australian language families, Pama Nyungan and Non-Pama-Nyungan (Northern).

The rock shelters and caves in Judbarra / Gregory contain an extensive amount of rock art, variously created by painting, stencilling, drawing, printing, and "pecking and pounding". The human figure is the most common motif; the park is "one of the most prolific sites in Australia" for composite engraved and painted human figures. The rock art of the Judbarra region is considered to represent a distinct art province.

Ecology
Ecologically, the park is in the transition between tropical and semi-arid zones.

The park has been identified by BirdLife International as an Important Bird Area (IBA) because it supports much of the eastern subspecies of the white-quilled rock-pigeon and small numbers of the endangered Gouldian finch, as well as populations of the chestnut-backed buttonquail, partridge pigeon, yellow-rumped mannikin and several other near-threatened or savanna-biome-restricted species.

A plant that is only known to the park, Solanum scalarium, also known as Garrarnawun bush tomato, was collected near Garrarnawun Lookout in 2018 and formally described in 2022.

See also
 Protected areas of the Northern Territory

References

External links
 
 Official fact sheet and map

National parks of the Northern Territory
Protected areas established in 1990
1990 establishments in Australia
Important Bird Areas of the Northern Territory
Kimberley tropical savanna